Liqenab (also Romanized as Līqenāb, Lighnab, Liqenāb, and Līqnāb) is a village in Oshtorinan Rural District, Oshtorinan District, Borujerd County, Lorestan Province, Iran. At the 2006 census, its population was 175, in 48 families.

References 

Towns and villages in Borujerd County